The VRC Champions Mile, registered as the Cantala Stakes, is a Group 1 Victoria Racing Club quality handicap Thoroughbred horse race run over 1,600 metres at Flemington Racecourse, Melbourne, Australia on the fourth and last day during the Melbourne Cup Carnival.  Total prize money is A$3,000,000

History
The race was moved in 2016 to the first day of the Melbourne Cup Carnival (Victoria Derby Day) from the last day. This was swapped with the LKS Mackinnon Stakes, which is now the feature race on the last day of the carnival. In 2022, the race was returned to the final day of the Melbourne Cup Carnival and renamed the VRC Champions Mile in order to align with the branding of the entire race day, which is now called Champions Day instead of Stakes Day.

1954 racebook

Name
 1881–1918 - Coburg Stakes
 1919–1961 - Cantala Stakes
 1962–1984 - George Adams Handicap
 1985–1988 - Ampol Stakes
 1989–1992 - Honda Stakes
 1993–1995 - Nissan Stakes
 1996–1997 - Chrysler Stakes
 1998–2015 - Emirates Stakes
 2016 - Cantala Stakes
 2017–2018 - Kennedy Mile
 2019–2021 - Kennedy Cantala Stakes
 2022 - Kennedy Champions Mile

Distance
 1881–1894 - 1 miles (~1800 metres)
1895–1971 - 1 mile (~1600 metres)
1972–1993 –  1600 metres
 1994 – 1616 metres
1995–2005 – 1600 metres
2006 – 1610 metres
2007 onwards - 1600 metres

Grade
1881–1978 -  Principal Race
1979 onwards - Group 1

Winners

 2022 – Alligator Blood 
 2021 – Superstorm
 2020 – Yulong Prince
 2019 – Fierce Impact
 2018 – Best Of Days
 2017 – Shillelagh
 2016 – Le Romain
 2015 – Turn Me Loose
 2014 – Hucklebuck
 2013 – Boban
 2012 – Happy Trails
 2011 – Albert The Fat
 2010 – Wall Street
 2009 – All American
 2008 – All Silent
 2007 – Tears I Cry
 2006 – Divine Madonna
 2005 – Valedictum
 2004 – Sky Cuddle
 2003 – Titanic Jack
 2002 – Scenic Peak
 2001 – Desert Eagle
 2000 – Testa Rossa
 1999 – Bonanova
 1998 – Bezeal Bay
 1997 – Catalan Opening
 1996 – Miss Margaret
 1995 – Seascay
 1994 – Seascay
 1993 – Primacy
 1992 – Planet Ruler
 1991 – Pontormo
 1990 – Shaftesbury Avenue
 1989 – Better Loosen Up
 1988 – Our Westminster
 1987 – Warned
 1986 – Chanteclair
 1985 – Dazzling Duke
 1984 – Riverdale
 1983 – Honest Promise
 1982 – Magari
 1981 – Tower Belle
 1980 – Silver Bounty
 1979 – Bit Of A Skite
 1978 – Family Of Man
 1977 – Galway Bay
 1976 – Maybe Mahal
 1975 – Kiwi Can
 1974 – Skyjack
 1973 – Taj Rossi
 1972 – All Shot
 1971 – Gunsynd
 1970 – Levian
 1969 – Vain
 1968 – Cyron
 1967 – Heroic Stone
 1966 – Storm Queen
 1965 – Heroic Stone
 1964 – Brandy Lad
 1963 – Wenona Girl
 1962 – Woambra
 1961 – Aquanita
 1960 – Aquanita
 1959 – Wheat King
 1958 – Droll Prince
 1957 – Landy
 1956 – Matrice
 1955 – Kosciusko
 1954 – Prince Cortauld
 1953 – Rio Janeiro
 1952 – Phaethon
 1951 – Kintail
 1950 – Ellerslie
 1949 – Comedy Prince
 1948 – Beau John
 1947 – Money Moon
 1946 – St. Fairy
 1945 – Royal Gem
 1944 – Gay Revelry
 1943 – Burberry
 1942 – Queen Baccha
 1941 – Burrabil
 1940 – Gold Salute
 1939 – Manrico
 1938 – St. Constant
 1937 – Mohican
 1936 – Gay Lover
 1935 – Hostile
 1934 – L'elite
 1933 – Care Free
 1932 – Denis Boy
 1931 – Dermid
 1930 – Mystic Peak
 1929 – Amounis
 1928 – Highland
 1927 – Vaals
 1926 – Amounis
 1925 – Waranton
 1924 – The Night Patrol
 1923 – Claro
 1922 – Violoncello
 1921 – Beeline
 1920 – Ethiopian
 1919 – Chal
1918 – Fitness
1917 – De Gama
1916 – Colugo
1915 – Fidelio
1914 – De Gama
1913 – Ireland
1912 – Walter Tyrril
1911 – Ladies' Man
1910 – Perilous
1909 – Kerlie
1908 – Iolaire
1907 – Iolaire
1906 – Benbow
1905 – Debenture
1904 – P.K.
1903 – Graft
1902 – Kinglock
1901 – Caledonia
1900 – Nitre
1899 – Security
1898 – Sailor Boy
1897 – The Grafter
1896 – Ayrshire
1895 – Hindoo
1894 – Escapade
1893 – Rosebrook
1892 – Cooya
1891 – Cardoness
1890 – Crown Jewel
1889 – Boz
1888 – Plutarch
1887 – Quintin Matsys
1886 – Day Star
1885 – The Bohemian
1884 – Josephine
1883 – Paul
1882 – Wizard
1881 – Courtenay

See also
Thoroughbred racing in Australia
Melbourne Spring Racing Carnival
 VRC Stakes day
 List of Australian Group races
 Group races

References

Open mile category horse races
Group 1 stakes races in Australia
Flemington Racecourse
The Emirates Group